The Inheritance is a play by Matthew Lopez that is inspired by the 1910 novel Howards End by E. M. Forster. The play premiered in London at the Young Vic in March 2018, before transferring to Broadway in November 2019.

Productions

Original London production
The play was commissioned by Hartford Stage in Hartford, Connecticut. The play was produced in London at the Young Vic Theatre under the direction of Stephen Daldry in March 2018. The play was staged in two parts of over three hours each, intended to be viewed sequentially and reimagines E. M. Forster's Howards End as "a lovingly wry portrait of New York’s gay community", "with gay men from different generations standing in for Forster’s straight people from different classes". Lopez found parallels between his own life and Forster's closeted existence before the partial-decriminalisation of homosexuality, telling The New Yorker: "We’re so far apart, and yet when I read his diaries—that’s me. That’s me, a hundred years ago, as a closeted white man in England". Lopez has described that the greatest theatrical influence, despite comparisons with Tony Kushner's Angels in America as being Gatz, Elevator Repair Service's 2-part, 8-hour adaptation of The Great Gatsby, inspiring his use of "self-narration".

The Inheritance examines love between gay men in contemporary New York a generation after the Early AIDS Crisis. It asks what the current generation owes to its forebears with Rebecca Read writing in The New Yorker that lead character Eric Glass, "as the grandson of Holocaust survivors, has a personal connection to generational catastrophe, and is therefore better primed to comprehend the history of the gay community’s devastation".

The production transferred to the Noël Coward Theatre in London's West End on 21 September 2018 and was produced by Tom Kirdahy, Sonia Friedman, and Hunter Arnold.

The Inheritance won Best Play at the London Evening Standard Theatre Award 2018. The Inheritance also won Best New Play, Best Director for Stephen Daldry and Best Actor for Kyle Soller at both the 2019 Critics' Circle Theatre Awards and the 2019 Laurence Olivier Awards, also winning an Olivier for Best Lighting for Jon Clark.

Original Broadway production
The play premiered on Broadway at the Ethel Barrymore Theatre on 27 September 2019 in previews, with the official opening on 17 November. The production features Lois Smith as Margaret, with Kyle Soller and John Benjamin Hickey, among others, reprising their roles from the London production.

In December 2019, it was announced that Tony Goldwyn would replace Hickey for a four-month stint beginning in January 2020, while Hickey was set to direct a revival of Plaza Suite. However, in February 2020, it was announced that The Inheritance would close on March 15, after 46 previews and 138 regular performances. On March 12, the final four performances were cancelled when all Broadway theatres closed to combat the COVID-19 pandemic.

Cast

Critical response
The reviewer for The Daily Telegraph called the play “perhaps the most important American play of this century.” 

The Variety reviewer wrote the play is a "vast, imperfect and unwieldy masterpiece that unpicks queer politics and neoliberal economics anew. In addressing the debt gay men owe to their forebears, it dares to ask whether the past hasn’t also sold the present up short."

The Guardian reviewer wrote: "While Lopez’s play has a literary framework, it teems with life and incident...Lopez is also unafraid to periodically stop the plot and clear the stage for an impassioned debate: one of the most intense is about the status of gay culture which, having fought so long against oppression, now finds itself in danger of being co-opted."

The show received mixed to negative reviews on Broadway. As Ben Brantley wrote in The New York Times: "Its breadth doesn't always translate into depth."

Michael Billington praised Paul Hilton's performance in the Young Vic Theatre production in a list by The Guardian writers of the 50 greatest theatre shows since 2000, in which The Inheritance placed 15th.

Writing in The New Yorker, Rebecca Mead drew comparisons to Angels in America, the two-part epic play by Tony Kushner, also examining the Early AIDS Crisis in New York, describing The Inheritance as "less intellectually demanding" and "strik[ing] an upper-middlebrow tone" and also comparing the play with Hanya Yanagihara's 2015 "gay-trauma" novel A Little Life.

Terrence McNally, author of the 1994 play Love! Valour! Compassion!, which addressed the AIDS Crisis contemporarily, said that "as an 80-year-old survivor, observer, and participant of the many years covered in the play" he had never had such a strong response, referring to the experience of watching a play about the Early AIDS Crisis amid an audience of gay men of both the survivors' generation and the subsequent generation, that of the protagonists.

Awards and nominations

Original London production

Original Broadway production

References

External links
 The Inheritance Internet Broadway database

2018 plays
E. M. Forster in performing arts
LGBT-related plays
Laurence Olivier Award-winning plays
Plays based on novels
Plays set in New York City
West End plays
HIV/AIDS in theatre
Tony Award-winning plays